Naiki may refer to:
Naiki language
Naiki people